The Theiss Sportster is an American homebuilt aircraft that was designed and produced by Theiss Aviation of Salem, Ohio, introduced in 1998. When it was available the aircraft was supplied as a kit for amateur construction.

Design and development
The aircraft features a biplane layout, a single-seat, open cockpit, fixed conventional landing gear and a single engine in tractor configuration. It was intended to resemble  biplane of the 1930s and mounts its upper wing not on cabane struts, but on a central pylon that has a tunnel to allow the pilot forward vision.

The aircraft is made with mixed construction, from aluminum, steel, wood and foam.

The manufacturer estimated the construction time from the supplied kit as 400 hours.

The company later turned its attention to produce unmanned aerial vehicles for the US Navy and no longer produces manned aircraft.

Operational history
By 1998 the company reported that two Sportsters had been completed and were flying. Customer kits were forecast to start shipping in March 1998.

Specifications (Sportster)

References

Sportster
1990s United States sport aircraft
1990s United States ultralight aircraft
1990s United States civil utility aircraft
Single-engined tractor aircraft
Biplanes
Homebuilt aircraft